The Man from Music Mountain may refer to:

 Man from Music Mountain (1938 film), American western film starring Gene Autry
 The Man from Music Mountain (1943 film), American western film starring Roy Rogers and Trigger